Abilene is a city in Taylor and Jones counties in the U.S. state of Texas. Its population was 125,182 at the 2020 census. It is the principal city of the Abilene metropolitan statistical area, which had an estimated population of 169,893, as of 2016. Abilene is home to three Christian universities: Abilene Christian University, McMurry University, and Hardin–Simmons University. It is the county seat of Taylor County. Dyess Air Force Base is located on the west side of the city.

Abilene is located off Interstate 20, between exits 279 on its western edge and 292 on the east. The city is looped by I-20 to the north, US 83/84 on the west, and Loop 322 to the east. A railroad divides the city down the center into north and south. The historic downtown area is on the north side of the railroad.

History

Established by cattlemen as a stock shipping point on the Texas and Pacific Railway in 1881, the city was named after Abilene, Kansas, the original endpoint for the Chisholm Trail. The T&P had bypassed the town of Buffalo Gap, the county seat at the time. Eventually, a landowner north of Buffalo Gap, Clabe Merchant, known as the father of Abilene, chose the name for the new town. According to a Dallas newspaper, about 800 people had already begun camping at the townsite before the lots were sold. The town was laid out by Colonel J. Stoddard Johnson, and the auction of lots began early on March 15, 1881. By the end of the first day, 139 lots were sold for a total of $23,810, and another 178 lots were sold the next day for $27,550.

Abilene was incorporated soon after being founded in 1881, and residents began to set their sights on bringing the county seat to Abilene. In a three-to-one vote, they won the county election to do so. In 1888, the Progressive Committee was formed to attract businesses to the area, and in 1890 renamed itself as the Board of Trade. By 1900, 3,411 people lived in Abilene. In that decade, the Board of Trade changed its name to the 25,000 Club, in the hope of reaching a population of 25,000 by the next census. By 1910, though, the population had increased only to 9,204. Another group was formed, the Young Men's Booster Club, which became the Abilene Chamber of Commerce in 1914.

The cornerstone was laid in 1891 for Simmons College, the first of three universities in Abilene. It later developed as Hardin–Simmons University. Childers Classical Institute was founded in 1906, and developed as Abilene Christian University, the largest of the three. In 1923, McMurry College was founded; it later expanded its offerings as McMurry University.

In the late 20th century, Abilene succeeded in gaining branches of Texas State Technical College and Cisco College. Headquarters of the latter institution are located in the city.

In 1940, Abilene raised the money to purchase land to attract establishment of a U.S. Army base, southwest of town. It was named Camp Barkeley. When fully operational, it was twice the size of Abilene, with 60,000 men. When the base closed after World War II, many worried that Abilene could become a ghost town, but as the national economy boomed, many veterans returned to start businesses in Abilene.

In the early-1950s, to advocate for an Air Force base, residents raised  to purchase  of land. The Southern block of Congressmen gained approval for such a base here. For decades, Dyess Air Force Base has been the city's largest employer, with 6076 employees in 2007.

From 1950 to 1960, Abilene's population nearly doubled, from 45,570 to 90,638. In 1960, a second high school was added to the city's school system, Cooper High School.

In 1966, the Abilene Zoo was established near Abilene Regional Airport. The following year, one of the most important bond elections in the city's history passed for the funding of the construction of the Abilene Civic Center and the Taylor County Coliseum, as well as major improvements to Abilene Regional Airport. In 1969, the Woodson elementary and high school for black students closed as the city integrated its school system, more than 10 years after the US Supreme Court's ruling in Brown v. Board of Education (1954) that segregation of public schools was unconstitutional.

In 1982, Abilene became the first city in Texas to create a downtown reinvestment zone. Texas State Technical College opened an Abilene branch three years later. The 2,250-bed French Robertson Prison Unit was built in 1989. A half-cent sales tax earmarked for economic development was created after the decline in the petroleum business in the 1980s. A branch of Cisco College was located in the city in 1990.

Several major projects of restoration and new construction: The Grace Museum and Paramount Theatre, and development of Artwalk in 1992, sparked a decade of downtown revitalization. In 2004, Frontier Texas!, a multimedia museum highlighting the history of the area from 1780 to 1880, was constructed. That year an $8 million,  Cisco Junior College campus was built at Loop 322 and Industrial Boulevard. Simultaneously, subdivisions and businesses started locating along the freeway, on the same side as the CC campus. This area attracted Abilene growth on the Loop.

Abilene has become the commercial, retail, medical, and transportation hub of a 19-county area more commonly known as "The Big Country", but also known as the "Texas Midwest". It is part of the Central Great Plains ecoregion. By the end of 2005, commercial and residential development had reached record levels in and around the city.

Timeline 

 1881
 Settlement established.
 Texas & Pacific Railroad begins operating.
 Abilene Reporter newspaper begins publication.
 1883
 Town of Abilene incorporated.
 D. B. Corley becomes mayor.
 Abilene becomes seat of Taylor County.
 1890 – Population: 3,194.
 1891 – Simmons College founded.
 1898 – "Federation" subscription library organized.
 1903 – Saloons banned in Abilene.
 1906 – Childers Classical Institute established.
 1910 – Population: 9,204.
 1919 – Abilene Zoological Gardens established.
 1923 – McMurry College established.
 1924 – First Presbyterian Church built.
 1925 – Majestic Theater, a major movie theater, opened.
 1930
 Paramount Theatre in business.
 Population: 23,175.
 1936 – KRBC radio begins broadcasting.
 1937
 Abilene Reporter-News in publication.
 Regional "West Texas Chamber of Commerce" relocated to Abilene.
 1942 – Temple Mizpah (synagogue) built.
 1945 – Eisenhower Returns celebration.
 1946 – Abilene Blue Sox baseball team formed.
 1947 – Office of city manager established.
 1949 – Park Drive-In cinema in business.
 1950 – Abilene Philharmonic Orchestra active.
 1953 – KRBC-TV (television) begins broadcasting.
 1956
 U.S. military Abilene Air Force Base begins operating.
 KPAR-TV (television) begins broadcasting.
 1960 – Population: 90,368.
 1977 – Abilene Preservation League organized.
 1978 – Alcohol prohibition ends in Abilene.
 1979 – Charles Stenholm was elected as the Democratic U.S. representative for Texas's 17th congressional district. He was re-elected for 13 terms.
 2000 – City website online (approximate date).
 2001 – World War II-related "12th Armored Division Memorial Museum" opens.
 2005 – Republican Randy Neugebauer was elected as U.S. representative for Texas's newly redrawn 19th congressional district, including Abilene.
 2010 – Population: 117,063.
 2017 – Jodey Arrington becomes U.S. representative for Texas's 19th congressional district.
2019 – revamping the downtown area of North Abilene. As of October 2019 a couple of buildings were torn down and Hilton developed a new Double Tree hotel.

Geography
Abilene is located in northeastern Taylor County. The city limits extend north into Jones County. Interstate 20 leads east  to Fort Worth and west  to Midland. Three U.S. highways pass through the city. US 83 runs west of the city center, leading north  to Anson and south  to Ballinger. US 84 runs with US 83 through the southwest part of the city but leads southeast  to Coleman and west with I-20  to Sweetwater. US 277 follows US 83 around the northwest side of the city and north to Anson, but heads southwest from Abilene  to San Angelo.

The water area is mainly from three reservoirs in the city: Lytle Lake southeast of downtown on the western edge of Abilene Regional Airport, Kirby Lake on the southeast corner of the US 83/84 and Loop 322 interchange, and Lake Fort Phantom Hill in Jones County in northern Abilene. Clear Creek runs through the city just east of downtown, flowing north to Elm Creek and ultimately part of the Brazos River watershed.

The fastest-growing sections of the city are in the southwest, along Southwest Drive, the Winters Freeway, and the Buffalo Gap Road corridor; the southeast, along Loop 322, Oldham Lane, Industrial Drive, and Maple Street; and in the northeast near the intersection of SH 351 and I-20. Many developments have begun in these three areas within the last few years with a citywide focus on the reinvigoration of downtown Abilene.

Climate
According to the Köppen climate classification, Abilene lies at the edge of a humid subtropical climate, with areas to the west being semiarid.

Notable architecture 

Notable and historical buildings in Abilene include:

Hotel Wooten (1930) at 302 Cypress Street downtown, built by grocery entrepreneur H. O. Wooten, at 16 stories tall, is designed after the Drake Hotel in Chicago. It was restored in 2004 as a high-end apartment building.
First Baptist Church (1954) at 1442 North Second Street has a spire 140 feet from the ground. Pastor Dr. Jesse Northcutt oversaw the planning of this building of 325 tons of steel.
The Church of the Heavenly Rest, Episcopal, at 602 Meander Street, reflects surprising Gothic architecture on the West Texas Plains. Its plaque reads: "No man entering a house ignores him who dwells in it. This is the house of God and He is here."
The 20-story Enterprise Tower at 500 Chestnut Street, the highest structure in Abilene, rises to 283 feet above the Plains. It is the tallest building in west-central Texas and one of the five highest in the western two-thirds of the state.
The Taylor County Courthouse at 300 Oak Street, with its international architectural style of concrete and pink granite, resembles few other courthouses.
Paramount Theatre at 352 Cypress Street opened in 1930 and restored in 1986 had an original marquee 90 feet tall, with 1,400 lights.
Lincoln Junior High School, 1699 South First Street. In 2012, the Abilene Independent School District deeded the property to the City of Abilene. This property was placed on the National Register of Historic Places on August 28, 2012. Built in 1923, the architecture is Gothic Revival and includes two large gargoyles at the entrance and has Gothic and art deco motifs. It opened as Abilene High School in 1924, became Lincoln Junior High in 1955, and Lincoln Middle School in 1985. The campus closed in 2007. As of 2019, the Abilene Heritage Square was renovating the school into "a multipurpose center for learning, making, discovery, building community and innovating and encouraging our city's future businesses." The Abilene Public Library will also use the restored building as the new main branch.

Demographics

As of the census of 2000, 115,930 people, 41,570 households, and 28,101 families resided in the city. The population density was 1,102.7 people per square mile (425.8/km2). The 45,618 housing units averaged 433.9 per square mile (167.5/km2). As of the 2010 census, Abilene had a population of 117,063. In 2020, its population was 125,182, with 43,607 households and 28,118 families residing in the city.

In 2000, the racial makeup of the city was 78.07% white, 8.81% African American, 0.55% Native American, 1.33% Asian, 0.07% Pacific Islander, 8.73% from other races, and 2.44% from two or more races. Hispanics or Latinos of any race were 19.45% of the population. The racial and ethnic makeup of the population in 2010 was 62.4% non-Hispanic White, 9.6% Black or African American, 0.7% Native American, 1.7% Asian, 0.1% Pacific Islander, 0.1% non-Hispanic reporting some other race, 3.3% of two or more races, and 24.5% Hispanic or Latino. By 2020, its racial and ethnic composition was 56.23% non-Hispanic white, 9.78% Black or African American, 0.4% Native American, 2.14% Asian, 0.11% Pacific Islander, 0.31% some other race, 4.16% multiracial, and 26.87% Hispanic or Latino of any race.

At the 2000 census, the median income for a household in the city was $33,007, and for a family was $40,028. Males had a median income of $28,078 versus $20,918 for females. The per capita income for the city was $16,577. About 10.9% of families and 15.4% of the population were below the poverty line, including 18.6% of those under age 18 and 9.2% of those age 65 or over. At the 2020 American Community Survey, the median household income in the city was $52,518. The mean household income was $70,807.

Economy
The economy in Abilene was originally based on the livestock and agricultural sectors, but is now based strongly on government, education, healthcare, and manufacturing. The petroleum industry is prevalent in the surrounding area, also. The city has established incentives to bring new businesses to the area, including job training grants, relocation grants, and more.

Top employers
The top 15 employers in Abilene, as of December 2019, were:

Government and infrastructure

The Texas Department of Criminal Justice (TDCJ) operates the Abilene District Parole Office in the city. The Robertson Unit prison and the Middleton Unit transfer unit are in Abilene and in Jones County.

The United States Postal Service operates the Abilene Post Office and the Abilene Southern Hills Post Office.

On June 17, 2017, Abilene elected its first African-American mayor, Anthony Williams.

 D. B. Corley, 1883–1885
 G. A. Kirkland, 1885–1886
 D. W. Wristen, 1886–1891
 H. A. Porter, 1891–1893
 D. W. Wristen, 1893–1897
 A. M. Robertson, 1897–1899
 John Bowyers, 1899–1901
 F. C. Digby Roberts, 1901–1904
 R. W. Ellis, 1904–1905
 Morgan Weaver, 1905–1907
 E. N. Kirby, 1906–1919
 Dallas Scarborough, 1919–1923
 Charles E. Coombes, 1923–1927
 Thomas E. Hayden, 1927–1931
 Lee R. York, 1931–1933
 C. L. Johnson, 1933–1937
 Will Hair, 1937–1947
 B. R. Blankenship, 1947–1949
 Hudson Smart, 1949–1951
 Ernest Grissom, 1951–1953
 C. E. Gatlin, 1953–1957
 Jess F. (T-Bone) Winters, 1957–1959
 George L Minter, 1959–1961
 C. R. Kinard, 1961–1963
 W. L. Byrd, 1963–1966
 Ralph N. Hooks, 1966–1969
 J. C. Hunter, Jr., 1969–1975
 Fred Lee Hughes, 1975–1978
 Oliver Howard, 1978–1981
 Elbert E. Hall, 1981–1984
 David Stubbeman, 1984–1987
 Dale E. Ferguson, 1987–1990
 Gary D. McCaleb, 1990–1999
 Grady Barr, 1999–2004
 Norm Archibald, 2004–2017
 Anthony Williams, 2017–present

Education

Primary education

Abilene has two school districts within the city limits: Abilene Independent School District (AISD) and Wylie Independent School District (WISD). High schools include Abilene High School and Cooper High School of AISD, and Wylie High School of WISD.

Colleges and universities

Abilene is home to six colleges, three of which are religiously affiliated. Hardin–Simmons University is the oldest, founded in 1891. Abilene Christian University is the largest with 2012 undergraduate enrollment at 4,371.

Health care
Hendrick Medical Center includes two large hospital campuses on the north and south sides of Abilene, and is one of the city's largest employers. It is one of seven healthcare institutions affiliated with the Baptist General Convention of Texas.

The Presbyterian Medical Care Mission was founded in 1983 as a medical and dental clinic. Its services are focused to low-income individuals and families without insurance.

Culture

The cultural aspects of Abilene revolve around a mix of the local college and university campuses, the agriculture community of the surrounding area, and a growing nightlife scene in the downtown area. Abilene is also home to the restored Paramount Theatre, the Abilene Philharmonic Orchestra, the Grace Museum, the Center for Contemporary Arts, the National Center for Children's Illustrated Literature, The Abilene Zoo, Frontier Texas!, the 12th Armored Division Museum, the Taylor County Expo Center, the Abilene Convention Center, six libraries (three private, three public), 26 public parks, six television stations, a daily newspaper, and several radio stations, including one NPR station (89.5 KACU).

Media

Newspapers
The Abilene Reporter-News is the primary daily newspaper of the city of Abilene and the surrounding Big Country area.

Television
 KRBC-TV (NBC)
 KTES-LD (Me-TV)
 KTXS-TV (ABC)
 KTAB-TV (CBS)
 KXVA-TV (FOX)

Radio

88.1 FM KGNZ (Christian contemporary)
89.5 FM KACU (Public Radio)
90.5 FM KAGT (Christian contemporary)
91.3 FM KAQD (Religious)
91.7 FM KQOS (Religious)
92.5 FM KMWX (Red Dirt Country)
93.3 FM KBGT (Tejano)
94.1 FM KVVO-LP (Inspirational Country)
95.1 FM KABW (Country)
96.1 FM KORQ (Farm, Country)
98.1 FM KTLT (Active Rock)
99.7 FM KBCY (Country)
100.7 FM KULL (Classic hits)
101.7 FM KTJK (Adult hits)
102.7 FM KHXS (Classic Rock)
103.7 FM KCDD (Top 40)
105.1 FM KEAN (Country)
106.3 FM KKHR (Regional Mexican)
106.9 FM KLGD (Country)
107.9 FM KEYJ (Active Rock)
1280 AM KSLI (Country)
1340 AM KWKC (News Talk)
1470 AM KYYW (News Talk)
1560 AM KZQQ (Sports talk)

Transportation

Major highways

 Interstate 20
 Business Loop 20
 US 80 (former)
 US 83
 US 84
 US 277
 SH 36
 Loop 322
 SH 351
 FM 89 (Buffalo Gap Road)
 FM 600
 FM 707 (Beltway South)
 UR 18
 UR 3438

Airport
The city of Abilene is served by Abilene Regional Airport.

Notable people

Ken Baumann, actor
Raleigh Brown, member of the Texas House of Representatives and a state-court judge
Doyle Brunson, two-time World Series of Poker champion, attended and played basketball at Hardin–Simmons College
Randall "Tex" Cobb, heavyweight boxer and actor
Charles Coody, Masters-winning professional golfer (from Stamford and Abilene) — graduate of ACU
Carole Cook, an actress, was born January 14, 1924, in Abilene as Mildred Frances Cook
Roy Crane, nationally syndicated cartoonist (Wash Tubbs, Captain Easy, Buz Sawyer)
Dorian, hip hop recording artist, was born in Abilene
Bob Estes, professional golfer
W. C. Friley, first president of Hardin–Simmons University, 1892–1894
Billy Gillispie, former Texas Tech University Red Raiders, Kentucky, and Texas A&M men's basketball coach
Ryan Guzman, actor
Homer Hailey (1903–2000), Church of Christ clergyman and professor at Abilene Christian University
David W. Harper (born 1961), actor, played James Robert Walton on CBS television series The Waltons, 1972–1981
Kristy Hawkins (born 1980), IFBB professional bodybuilder
Jerry Herron (born 1949), dean of Wayne State University Honors College
Katie Hill, former U.S. congresswoman from CA-25
Micah P. Hinson, indie rock singer
Gregory Hoblit, film director
Robert Dean Hunter, member of Texas House of Representatives from Abilene, 1986–2007; vice president emeritus of Abilene Christian University
Bill Jones, former NFL player for the Kansas City Chiefs
Morgan Jones, railroad builder
Rainy Day Jordan, Playboy playmate (Miss December 2011)
Ashley Kavanaugh, public official and former political aide; wife of Supreme Court Justice Brett Kavanaugh
Case Keenum, quarterback for the Buffalo Bills
Johnny Knox, former wide receiver for the Chicago Bears
John Lackey, former starting pitcher for the Chicago Cubs
Billy Maxwell, golfer, winner of seven PGA Tour events
Mildred Paxton Moody, wife of Governor Dan Moody
Bobby Morrow, three-time gold medal winner at 1956 Olympic Games in Melbourne, named Sportsman of the Year in 1956 by Sports Illustrated
Scott Nagy, head coach of the Wright State University men's basketball team, and former head coach for South Dakota State University men's basketball
Billy Olson, pole vaulter (1988 Summer Olympics, for the U.S. team that boycotted the 1980 Summer Olympics); held several world records
Ty O'Neal, rodeo cowboy and film actor
Terry Orr, tight end for the Washington Redskins — played for CHS
Fess Parker (1924–2010), actor and hotel and winery owner, attended Hardin–Simmons University, played football at HSU before transferring to University of Texas, starred in TV as Davy Crockett and Daniel Boone
Lee Roy Parnell, country musician
Vinnie Paul (1964–2018), born in Abilene; musician, co-founder, and drummer of heavy metal band Pantera and Damageplan, drummer of Hellyeah
Charles Perry, member of Texas Senate from Lubbock, was born in Abilene in 1962
Dominic Rhodes, born in Waco Texas, football player for Cooper High School, NFL football player for Indianapolis Colts
Lou Halsell Rodenberger, author and biographer of Jane Gilmore Rushing, professor at McMurry University
Rick Roderick, philosopher
Bill Sharman, Hall-of-Fame NBA basketball player and coach, born in Abilene
Jessica Simpson, singer and actress, born in Abilene
Jorge A. Solis (born 1951), U.S. federal judge, 5th Circuit
Rawson Stovall, video game producer/designer, author, and first nationally syndicated reviewer of video games 
Steven Stucky, Pulitzer Prize-winning American composer
Sarah Weddington, lawyer, represented "Jane Roe" in case of Roe v. Wade
Ann Wedgeworth, actress
Mason Williams, musician, best known for his guitar instrumental "Classical Gas"

Sister cities
 Chita, Zabaykalsky Krai, Russia

See also

List of museums in West Texas
Abilene CityLink
Abilene paradox

References

Bibliography

 
 
 
 
  
 Abilene...On Catclaw Creek: A Profile of a West Texas Town (Abilene, Texas: Reporter Publishing, 1969)
 Katharyn Duff and Betty Kay Seibt. Catclaw Country: An Informal History of Abilene in West Texas (Burnet, Texas: Eakin Press, 1980)
 Fane Downs, ed. The Future Great City of West Texas: Abilene, 1881–1981 (Abilene: Richardson, 1981).
 Paul D. Lack et al. The History of Abilene (Abilene, Texas: McMurry College, 1981)
 Juanita Daniel Zachry. Abilene (Northridge, California: Windsor, 1986).
 
 
 
 
 
 
 Lost Abilene: Images of America, Charleston, South Carolina: Arcadia Publishing. 2013. 
 
  (List of U.S. Congressional representatives for Abilene, 1883–2016)

External links

 
 Convention & Visitors Bureau
 Abilene.com
 
   (circa 1900s-1950s)
 
 
 Items related to Abilene, Texas, various dates (via Digital Public Library of America)
 

 
Cities in Texas
Cities in Taylor County, Texas
Cities in Jones County, Texas
County seats in Texas
Busking venues
Cities in the Abilene metropolitan area
Populated places established in 1881
1881 establishments in Texas